This is a list of wars involving the Republic of Uzbekistan and its predecessors

References

 
Uzbekistan
Wars